Syria competed at the 2004 Summer Paralympics in Athens, Greece. The team included 5 athletes, 3 men and 2 women, but won no medals.

Sports

Powerlifting

Men

Women

See also
Syria at the Paralympics
Syria at the 2004 Summer Olympics

References 

Nations at the 2004 Summer Paralympics
2004
Summer Paralympics